IEEE Spectrum is a magazine edited by the Institute of Electrical and Electronics Engineers.

The first issue of IEEE Spectrum was published in January 1964 as a successor to Electrical Engineering. The magazine contains peer-reviewed articles about technology and science trends affecting business and society.

In 2010, IEEE Spectrum was the recipient of Utne Reader magazine's Utne Independent Press Award for Science/Technology Coverage. In 2012, IEEE Spectrum was selected as the winner of the National Magazine Awards "General Excellence Among Thought Leader Magazines" category.

References

External links 
 

Monthly magazines published in the United States
Science and technology magazines published in the United States
Engineering magazines
Spectrum
Magazines established in 1964
Magazines published in New York City
Open access publications